The Cape Foulwind Lighthouse is a lighthouse that is located at Cape Foulwind,  west of the town of Westport on the West Coast of New Zealand's South Island. The LED light flashes white once every 12 seconds and has a range . It is a Category 2 heritage listed structure.

History 
The need for a lighthouse was identified during the goldrush era; however, it was not until 1 September 1876 that the light was first lit. The original hexagonal tower was built of rimu. It suffered from rot, and was replaced in 1926 by the present concrete tower with an automated light, which is now operated remotely from Maritime New Zealand's Wellington office. Traces of foundations of the old tower and the keeper's houses can still be seen.

Access 
The lighthouse is an  drive west from the town of Westport and a ten-minute walk from the northern end of the Cape Foulwind walkway. The circular walkway goes past the lighthouse, and on to the New Zealand Fur Seal colony at Tauranga Bay, with views back to the lighthouse. Entry into the lighthouse structure itself is not permitted.

Operations
The lighthouse is operated by the Maritime New Zealand, it is registered under the international Admiralty number K4486 and it has the NGA identifier of 111–5600. Its characteristic is a white flash every twelve seconds, originally fitted with a Fresnel optic, it now uses an LED system fixed to the gallery railing.

Gallery

References 

Lighthouses in New Zealand
Lighthouses completed in 1876
Tourist attractions in the West Coast, New Zealand
Westport, New Zealand
Heritage New Zealand Category 2 historic places in the West Coast, New Zealand
Transport buildings and structures in the West Coast, New Zealand